Johan Rickard Andersson (born 22 August 1983) is a Swedish former professional footballer who played as a midfielder.

Career
Johan Andersson was reunited with his former coach Janne Jönsson from his early Landskrona career when he joined Stabæk ahead of the 2008 season. He scored two goals in his league debut for Stabæk at home against Lillestrøm in a 4–2 victory. In total he ended up scoring 12 goals in 25 games from midfield in the league, only behind team-mate Daniel Nannskog in the goal scoring chart when Stabæk won their first ever league title. In Stabæks UEFA Cup run he was involved in both matches against Rennes as they narrowly lost out in the group phase. He started all Stabæk's 7 cup games including the final against Vålerenga which they lost, scoring 5 goals in the process.

On 17 January it was reported that Andersson would need an operation on his knee, which would keep him out for most of the season. He would not be ready before late July.

He made his comeback on 29 July against F.C. Copenhagen in a Champions League qualifier as a late second-half substitute. After five more substitute appearances, he started his first game of the season on 19 September against Odd Grenland, scoring a goal in a 2–1 victory.

Andersson played 22 games and scored four goals for Stabæk in 2011, and joined Lillestrøm ahead of the 2012-season along with his team-mate Pálmi Rafn Pálmason.

Career statistics

References

External links
 

1983 births
Living people
Swedish expatriate footballers
Swedish footballers
Sweden under-21 international footballers
Landskrona BoIS players
Malmö FF players
Stabæk Fotball players
Lillestrøm SK players
Superettan players
Allsvenskan players
Eliteserien players
Expatriate footballers in Norway
Swedish expatriate sportspeople in Norway
Association football midfielders
People from Landskrona Municipality
Footballers from Skåne County